Ajayan Adat born in Thrissur on December 31, 1987. He is working in film sector as recordist, Sync sound Recordist mainly in Malayalam films. He is based in Cochin. He is best known for his works in  films like Soni (film), Nayattu (2021 film), Virus, Koode etc. He completed his primary and secondary education at Sree Rama Krishna Gurukula Vidhaya Mandiram.  After completing his Graduation in Physics from the Sree Kerala Varma College in 2008, he joined the Film and Television Institute of India, Pune for Post Graduation Diploma in Sound Recording and Sound Design. After graduating in 2016, he started his career in Malayalam film industry as recordist, Sync sound Recordist.,

Filmography

As Production Sound Mixer

As Sound Designer

As additional sync sound recordist

References

External links
  
 
 
 
 
https://www.moviebuff.com/ajayan-adat
https://iffr.com/en/2017/films/sakhisona
https://m3db.com/artists/69325
https://iffr.com/en/2017/films/sakhisona
https://indianexpress.com/article/entertainment/entertainment-others/international-film-festival-in-rotterdam-ftii-students-film-picked-for-festival-4443772/
https://www.thenewsminute.com/article/ftii-students-unrelenting-will-continue-protest
https://countercurrents.org/2018/06/film-fraternity-condemn-the-decision-by-malayalam-film-actors-body-to-reinstate-dileep/

1987 births
Living people
People from Thrissur district
Film and Television Institute of India alumni
Indian sound designers
21st-century Indian composers